A harmonica, or mouth organ, is a free-reed wind instrument.

Harmonica may also refer to:

Music

Classical
 Adagio and Rondo for glass harmonica, flute, oboe, viola and cello, composed in 1791 by Wolfgang Amadeus Mozart
 Concerto for Harmonica and Orchestra, composed 1954 by Malcolm Arnold

Groups
 Cambridge Harmonica Orchestra, formed in 1981 in Cambridge, Massachusetts
 Cappy Barra Harmonica Band, an American harmonica ensemble active circa 1935–1945
 The Harmonica Gentlemen, an American trio active after World War II
 King's College Harmonica Band, formed in 1951 in Hong Kong
 Morton Fraser's Harmonica Gang, a British comedy musical group active circa 1946–1980s

Instruments
 Chromatic harmonica, a type of harmonica with a button-activated sliding bar 
 Glass harmonica, or glass harmonium, a type of friction idiophone
 Richter-tuned harmonica, or blues harp, a common type of harmonica
 Tremolo harmonica, a type of harmonica with two reeds per note

Organizations
 HarmonicaUK, UK-based, founded in 1935 as the National Harmonica League
 The Society for the Preservation and Advancement of the Harmonica, US-based, founded in 1962

Recordings
"Alvin's Harmonica", a 1959 single by Alvin and the Chipmunks
Harmonica Solos, a 2013 album by George Winston
"Hey Harmonica Man", a 1964 single by Stevie Wonder
Man Bites Harmonica!, a 1958 album by Jean "Toots" Thielemans

Related items
 Asia Pacific Harmonica Festival, held bi-annually since 1996
 Harmonica concerto, a list of such compositions
 Harmonica techniques, a list of such techniques
 Magnus Harmonica Corporation, formed in 1944 in New Jersey as the International Plastic Harmonica Corporation

Moths
 Brenthia harmonica, found in the Philippines
 Didrimys harmonica,  found in Sri Lanka, Java, Borneo, and New Guinea
 Glaucocharis harmonica, endemic to New Zealand

People
listed alphabetically by last name
 Terry "Harmonica" Bean (born 1961), American musician born in Mississippi
 Harmonica Fats (1927–2000), American musician born in Louisiana
 Harmonica Frank (1908–1984), American musician born in Mississippi
 Harmonica Hinds (born 1945), Trinidadian-American musician
 Harmonica Shah (born 1946), American musician born in California
 Harmonica Slim (1934–1984), American musician born in Texas
 George "Harmonica" Smith (1924–1983), American musician born in Arkansas

Other
 Elementa harmonica, a treatise on the subject of musical scales by Aristoxenus from the 4th century BC
 Harmonica gun, a type of firearm
 Harmonica house, a type of row house in North Korea
 Harmonica Incident, an event during the New York Yankees' 1964 season
 Tunes for a Small Harmonica, a 1976 novel by Barbara Wersba

See also